Campaign slogans have been a part of most Philippine presidential elections. Such slogans are either formulated by the candidates themselves or popularized by their own supporters which the candidate may later formally adopt.

List

See also 
List of U.S. presidential campaign slogans

References

Campaign slogans
 
Philippine presidential campaign slogans
Philippine presidential campaign